Lagona Village is located close to the centre of Dahab on the Sinai Peninsula in Egypt. Restaurants and shops are inviting along the beach promenade.

The small Bedouin village of Dahab, with its unique topographic position as one of the most beautiful desert oasis in Sinai, can be reached within one hour by car from Sharm El Sheikh’s International Airport. 

Right in front of amazing Sinai mountain ranges and beside different bays along the coast of Aqaba, the coral reef is dropping down to 800 metres depth not far away from shore.

Lagona village is located close to the center of Dahab, where restaurants and shops are located along the beach promenade.

Sinai Peninsula
Populated places in South Sinai Governorate
Villages in Egypt